Colin Hugh Kiaran Woodhouse (12 February 1934  – 29 August 2011) was a screenwriter and the younger brother of Martin Woodhouse, also a screenwriter. Together, they wrote some episodes of Supercar.

Woodhouse enrolled at St John's College, Cambridge, in 1954. In 2002, he became associated with Cubeword Games Limited, a Shaftesbury-based manufacturer of games and toys. He became a company director on 17 April, and on 7 May, Woodhouse became a secretary.

By a tragic coincidence, he died on his brother's birthday, 29 August 2011

References

British screenwriters
British television writers
Toy inventors
1934 births
2011 deaths